Progress M-40 was a Russian unmanned Progress cargo spacecraft, which was launched in October 1998 to resupply the Mir space station, carry the Sputnik 41 satellite and the unsuccessful Znamya 2.5 solar mirror.

Launch
Progress M-40 launched on 25 October 1998 from the Baikonur Cosmodrome in Kazakhstan. It used a Soyuz-U rocket.

Docking
Progress M-40 docked with the aft port of the Kvant-1 module of Mir on 27 October 1998 at 05:34:41 UTC, and was undocked on 4 February 1999 at 09:59:32 UTC. On 4 February 1999 at 10:24 UTC, following undocking from Mir, an unsuccessful attempt was made to deploy Znamya 2.5, a solar mirror.

Decay
It remained in orbit until 5 February 1999, when it was deorbited. The deorbit burn occurred at 10:16:05 UTC, with the mission ending at 11:09:30 UTC.

See also

 1998 in spaceflight
 List of Progress missions
 List of uncrewed spaceflights to Mir

References

Progress (spacecraft) missions
1998 in Kazakhstan
Spacecraft launched in 1998
Spacecraft which reentered in 1999
Spacecraft launched by Soyuz-U rockets